Anapa is a city in Krasnodar Krai, Russia

Anapa may also refer to:
Anapa Urban Okrug, a municipal formation in Krasnodar Krai, Russia
Anapa Airport, an airport in the city of Anapa, Krasnodar Krai, Russia